Juan Pistolas may refer to:

 Juan Pistolas (1936 film), a Mexican film directed by Roberto Curwood 
 Juan Pistolas (1966 film), a Mexican film directed by René Cardona Jr.